Piyathip Sansaniyakulvilai (born 23 October 1972) is a Thai badminton player. She competed in women's doubles at the 1992 Summer Olympics in Barcelona.

References

External links

1972 births
Living people
Piyathip Sansaniyakulvilai
Piyathip Sansaniyakulvilai
Badminton players at the 1992 Summer Olympics
Piyathip Sansaniyakulvilai
Piyathip Sansaniyakulvilai